Captain Tugg was the host of a local children's cartoon show that was broadcast in the early 1960s by WTTG, Channel 5, a Washington, D.C. television station.  Captain Tugg was the master of the Channel Queen, a tugboat that plied the Potomac River, near the capital city.  With his parrot, Fantail (a puppet), he fought spies Spike Marlin and Axel Grackle and the Sea Hag.  Lee Reynolds, the actor who played Tugg, also played Commander Salamander and a number of other characters on the show.  His skits and adlibbed lines were sandwiched between animated cartoons.  On Christmas Eve, the captain would use his onboard radar to track Santa's progress as he made his international rounds.

Cartoon segments
Popeye
The Adventures of Rocky and Bullwinkle and Friends
Space Angel
The Mighty Hercules
Clutch Cargo

Further reading
 Hi There, Boys and Girls!: America's Local Children's TV Programs by Tim Hollis, University Press of Mississippi (2010)

External links 
 Cap'n Tugg page at dcmemories.com

Tugg
Local children's television programming in the United States
American television shows featuring puppetry